The 2009 World Marathon Cup was the 13th edition of the World Marathon Cup of athletics and were held in Berlin, Germany, inside of the 2009 World Championships.

The Russian women's team fell from the third to the fifth place, after Nailiya Yulamanova (eighth place; 2:27:08 h) had been disqualified because of doping. The Russian men's team (seventh place) dropped out of the rankings after the disqualification of Mikhail Lemaev (45th place; 2:21:47 h).

Results

See also
2009 World Championships in Athletics – Men's Marathon
2009 World Championships in Athletics – Women's Marathon

External links
 Official World Cup Results Marathon - M
 Official World Cup Results Marathon - W

World Marathon Cup
World
2005 in Spanish sport
Marathons in Germany
International athletics competitions hosted by Germany